Dağbek is a village in the Pülümür District, Tunceli Province, Turkey. The village is populated by Kurds of the Abasan tribe and had a population of 36 in 2021.

References 

Kurdish settlements in Tunceli Province
Villages in Pülümür District